Stephen Michael Strachan (born March 22, 1963, in Everett, Massachusetts) is a former American football running back in the National Football League. He played for the Los Angeles Raiders. He played college football for the Boston College Eagles. He was the MVP of the 1985 Cotton Bowl Classic. He had 23 carries for 91 yards and two touchdowns.

References

1963 births
Living people
Sportspeople from Everett, Massachusetts
American football running backs
Boston College Eagles football players
Los Angeles Raiders players
National Football League replacement players